A source document is a document in which data collected for a clinical trial is first recorded. This data is usually later entered in the case report form. The International Conference on Harmonisation of Technical Requirements for Registration of Pharmaceuticals for Human Use (ICH-GCP) guidelines define source documents as "original documents, data, and records." Source documents contain source data, which is defined as "all information in original records and certified copies of original records of clinical findings, observations, or other activities in a clinical trial necessary for the reconstruction and evaluation of the trial."

The Food and Drug Administration (FDA) does not define the term "source document".

Examples of source documents 
Hospital records
Clinical and office charts
Laboratory notes
Memorandum 
Cash memo
Debit note, Credit note
Pay in slip
Subjects' diaries or evaluation checklists
Pharmacy dispensing records
Recorded data from automated instruments
Copies or transcriptions certified after verification as being accurate copies
Microfiches 
Photographic negatives, microfilm or magnetic media
X-rays
Subject files
Records kept at the pharmacy, at the laboratories and at medico-technical departments involved in the clinical trial

References

Clinical research
Pharmaceutical industry
Clinical data management